Further Beyond is a 2016 film by Desperate Optimists (Christine Molloy and Joe Lawlor) that has been described as "part essay, documentary and quirky drama" and a 'masterpiece of intricate if indirect construction.'

The film is very loosely based on the story of Ambrosio O'Higgins, an Irish-Spanish colonial administrator who served the Spanish Empire as captain general of Chile from 1788 to 1796 and as viceroy of Peru from 1796 to 1801. However, as David Jenkins notes in Little White Lies, it is a "movie biopic that’s been carefully pulled inside-out, interested in posing questions about the ethics of representation and what it means to deliver personal history as objective fact".

Further Beyond was made under the Arts Council Ireland Reel Art scheme.

Cast
 Jose Miguel Jimenez as Ambrosio O'Higgins
 Denise Gough as Voice Over 1
 Alan Howley as Voice Over 2
 Aidan Gillen as Ambrosio O'Higgins

Reception
Further Beyond was very well received critically with Mark Kermode describing it as "groundbreaking" and "playful". Leslie Filperin gave it a five star review in the Guardian and called it "essential viewing".

Release
Further Beyond had its world premiere at the Dublin International Film Festival on 19 February 2016, and its international premiere in competition at FID Marseille in 2016, followed by its UK premiere at the London Film Festival in 2016. The film then went on to screen on MUBI and in selected UK and Irish cinemas.

References

External links
 

2016 films
English-language Irish films
2010s English-language films